The Free German Workers' Party (abbreviated FAP) was a neo-Nazi political party in Germany. It was outlawed by the Federal Constitutional Court in 1995.

History 
The FAP was founded in 1979 but was largely insignificant until the banning of the Action Front of National Socialists/National Activists in 1983 when Michael Kühnen encouraged members to infiltrate this tiny group. A minor party (around 500 members in 1987) it experienced something of a growth after German reunification and sought, unsuccessfully, an alliance with the National Democratic Party. It contested the 1987 federal election and the 1989 European elections although in both instances it attracted negligible support.

Associated with Strasserism, the FAP party managed to gain some support amongst football hooligans but was damaged by Kühnen's homosexuality, and took a stand against him. The party continued under Friedhelm Busse from 1989 but it lost a number of members to new groups loyal to Kühnen, including the German Alternative (1989) and the National Offensive (1990).

The party was outlawed by the Federal Constitutional Court on 24 February 1995.

References

External links 
 Party flag

Banned far-right parties
Banned political parties in Germany
Neo-Nazism in Germany
Political parties established in 1979
Political parties disestablished in 1995
Far-right political parties in Germany
Fascist parties in Germany
1979 establishments in West Germany
1995 disestablishments in Germany
German nationalist political parties
Strasserism